A stapled peptide is a short peptide, typically in an alpha-helical conformation, that is constrained by a synthetic brace ("staple"). The staple is formed by a covalent linkage between two amino acid side-chains, forming a peptide macrocycle. Staples, generally speaking, refer to a covalent linkage of two previously independent entities. Peptides with multiple, tandem staples are sometimes referred to as stitched peptides. Among other applications, peptide stapling is notably used to enhance the pharmacologic performance of peptides.

Introduction
The two primary classes of therapeutics are small molecules and protein therapeutics. The design of small molecule inhibitors of protein-protein interactions has been impeded by issues such as the general lack of small-molecule starting points for drug design, the typical flatness of the interface, the difficulty of distinguishing real from artifactual binding, and the size and character of typical small-molecule libraries. Meanwhile, the protein therapeutics that lack these issues are bedeviled by another problem, poor cell penetration due to an insufficient ability to diffuse across the cell membrane. Additionally, protein and peptides are often subject to proteolytic degradation if they do enter the cell. Furthermore, small peptides (such as single alpha-helices or α-Helices) can lose helicity in solution due to entropic factors, which diminishes binding affinity.

α-Helices are the most common protein secondary structure and play a key role in mediating many protein–protein interactions (PPIs) by serving as recognition motifs. PPIs are frequently misregulated in disease, provides the long-running impetus to create alpha-helical peptides to inhibit disease-state PPIs for clinical applications, as well as for basic science applications. Introducing a synthetic brace (staple) helps to lock a peptide in a specific conformation, reducing conformational entropy. This approach can increase target affinity, increase cell penetration, and protect against proteolytic degradation. Various strategies have been employed for constraining α-helices, including the non-covalent and covalent stabilization techniques; however, the all-hydrocarbon covalent link, termed a peptide staple, has been shown to have improved stability and cell penetrability, making this stabilization strategy particularly relevant for clinical applications.

Invention
Staples synthesized using ring-closing metathesis (RCM) are common. This variation of olefin metathesis and its application to stapled peptides was developed by Nobel laureate Robert H. Grubbs and Helen Blackwell in the late 1990s, who used the Grubbs catalyst to cross-link O-allylserine residues in a covalent bond. In 2000, Gregory Verdine and colleagues reported the first synthesis of an all-hydrocarbon cross-link for peptide α-helix stabilization, combining the principles of RCM with α,α-disubstitution of the amino acid chiral carbon and on-resin peptide synthesis. In collaboration with Edward Taylor of Princeton University, Loren Walensky, who was then a post-doc in Verdine's lab, subsequently demonstrated that stapling BH3 peptides enabled the synthetic peptides to retain their α-helical conformation, further demonstrating that these peptides were taken up by cancer cells and bound their physiologic BCL-2 family targets, which correlated with the induction of cell death. Walensky discovered that the peptides side-stepped the membrane diffusion issue by crossing the membrane through active endosomal uptake, which deposited the peptides inside of the cell. Since this first proof of principle, peptide stapling technology has been applied to numerous peptide templates, allowing the study of many other PPIs using stapled peptides including cancer targets such as p53, MCL-1 BH3, and PUMA BH3, as well as other therapeutic targets ranging from infectious diseases to metabolism.

Clinical Application
In 2013, Aileron Therapeutics, which was co-founded by Verdine, Walensky and Taylor, completed the first stapled peptide clinical trial with their growth-hormone-releasing hormone agonist ALRN-5281. As of 2019, Aileron Therapeutics is developing another candidate, ALRN-6924, in a Phase 2a trial that assesses the combination of ALRN-6924 and Pfizer’s palbociclib for the treatment of patients with MDM2-amplified cancers, and a Phase 1b/2 clinical trial to evaluate ALRN-6924 as a myelopreservative agent to protect against chemotherapy-induced toxicities.

See also
 Beta-peptide
 Druggability
 Non-proteinogenic amino acids
 Peptide synthesis
 Peptidomimetic
 Peptoid

References

Peptides